This is a list of parks in Los Angeles County, California outside of the city of Los Angeles itself (for those, please see List of parks in Los Angeles).

There are at least 183 parks maintained by Los Angeles County Department of Parks and Recreation, many of which are in unincorporated areas of the county.  Some of these are actually owned by the state of California, e.g. Kenneth Hahn State Recreation Area.

Locations of all places having coordinates below may be seen in a map together by clicking upon "Map all coordinates using: OpenStreetMap" at the right of this page.

State parks in Los Angeles County
California state parks that are in Los Angeles County outside of the city of Los Angeles include:

Beverly Hills, California
Beverly Cañon Gardens
Beverly Gardens Park
Franklin Canyon Park
La Cienega Park
Roxbury Memorial Park
Will Rogers Memorial Park

Culver City municipal parks

Long Beach municipal parks
 El Dorado Park

Manhattan Beach municipal parks

Manhattan Beach is an incorporated city in western Los Angeles County, California; its municipal parks include:

 Bruce’s Beach
 Live Oak Park
 Manhattan Heights Park
 Manhattan Village Park
 Marine Avenue Park
 Polliwog Park, with Manhattan Beach Botanical Garden
 Sand Dune Park
 Veterans Parkway

Its pocket parks include:

 Eighth Street Parquette
 Larsson Street Parquette

Santa Monica

Torrance
Columbia Park

West Hollywood
Plummer Park

See also
List of California state parks
List of parks in Los Angeles

References

External links

Parks in Los Angeles County, California
Los Angeles County, California